Deir al-Balah or Deir al Balah is a Palestinian city in the central Gaza Strip and the administrative capital of the Deir el-Balah Governorate. The city had a population of 54,439 in 2007. The city is known for its date palms, after which it is named.

Deir al-Balah dates back to the Late Bronze Age when it served as a fortified outpost for the New Kingdom of Egypt. A monastery was built there by the Christian monk Hilarion in the mid-4th century AD and is currently believed to be the site of a mosque dedicated to Saint George, known locally as al-Khidr. During the Crusader-Ayyubid wars, Deir al-Balah was the site of a strategic coastal fortress known as "Darum" which was continuously contested, dismantled and rebuilt by both sides until its final demolition in 1196. Afterward, the site grew to become a large village on the postal route of the Mamluk Sultanate (13th-15th centuries). It served as an episcopal see of the Greek Orthodox Church of Jerusalem in Ottoman times until the late 19th century.

Under Egyptian control Deir al-Balah, whose population tripled through the influx of refugees from the 1948 Arab-Israeli War, was a prosperous agricultural town until its capture by Israel in the Six-Day War. After 27 years of Israeli occupation, Deir al-Balah became the first city to come under Palestinian self-rule in 1994. Since the outbreak of the Second Intifada in 2000, it has witnessed frequent incursions by the Israeli Army with the stated aim of stopping Qassam rocket fire into Israel. Ahmad Kurd, a Hamas member, was elected mayor in late January 2005.

Etymology
"Deir al-Balah," which in Arabic translates as the "Monastery of the Date Palm," was named after the grove of date palms that laid west of the city. Its name dates back to the late 19th century, before which the city was locally known as "Deir Mar Jiryis" or "Deir al-Khidr" and "Deir Darum" in Ottoman records. "Mar Jiryis" translates as "Saint George" while in Islamic tradition al-Khidr could either refer to Saint George or Elijah. The inhabitants of Deir al-Balah associated al-Khidr with Saint George. The town had been named after al-Khidr, the most venerated saintly person throughout Palestine. The mosque in Deir al-Balah which bears his name is traditionally believed by locals to contain his tomb.

Up until the later Ottoman era, Deir al-Balah was referred to in Arabic as "Darum" or "Darun" which derived from the settlement's Crusader-era Latin name "Darom" or "Doron." That name was explained by the Crusader chronicler William of Tyre as a corruption of domus Graecorum, "house of the Greeks" (dar ar-rum). More recently, the eighteenth century scholar Albert Schultens supposed its roots are the Ancient Hebrew name "Darom" or "Droma", from the Hebrew root for "south", which referred to the area south of Lydda, i.e. the southern parts of the coastal plain and Judean foothills together with the northern Negev Desert. During early Arab rule, "ad-Darum" or "ad-Dairan" was the name of the southern subdistrict of Bayt Jibrin.

History

Ancient period

Deir al-Balah's history dates back to the mid-14th century BC, during the Late Bronze Age. At that time it served as an outpost in the New Kingdom of Egypt on its frontier with Canaan. During the reign of King Ramesses II (1303–1213 BC), Deir al-Balah became the easternmost of six garrisoned fortresses in the Eastern Mediterranean. The string of fortresses began with the Sinai fort in the west, and continued through the "Way of Horus" military road to Canaan. The square-shaped fortress of Deir al-Balah had four towers at each corner and a reservoir. Archaeological findings in Deir al-Balah revealed a large ancient Egyptian cemetery with graves containing jewelry and other personal belongings. The inhabitants of the fortress employed traditional Egyptian techniques and artistic designs in their architectural works. The cosmopolitan aspect of the frontier site is proven by the rich Cypriot, Mycenaean and Minoan findings.

Deir al-Balah remained in Egyptian hands until around 1150 BC when the Philistines conquered the southern coastal area of Canaan. The Philistine settlement is thought to have been situated southwest of the excavation site; its remains are hidden under large sand dunes. Five pits dug into the Late Bronze Age layers and containing Philistine pottery are among the few findings from that period.

The archaeological excavations at the Egyptian-period site were executed between 1972 and 1982, during Israel's occupation, and headed by Trude Dothan. After the conclusion of the excavations the area was used for farming purposes and is now covered by vegetable gardens and fruit orchards while the main findings can be seen in Israeli museums like the Israel Museum in Jerusalem and the Hecht Museum in Haifa.

Similar cultural development is also attested at Tall al-Ajjul at that time, also in the Gaza strip.

Byzantine period
During Byzantine rule, the first hermitage in Palestine was established by the early Christian monk Hilarion at the site of modern-day Deir al-Balah. Hilarion initially built a small hut there, but during the reign of Constantius II (337–361) he set up the hermitage. Towards the end of his life, the monastery grew and began to attract numerous visitors. Hilarion resided at the monastery for a total of 22 years until his departure for Cyprus where he died in 371 AD. The hermitage was divided into several small cells constructed of mud brick and palm tree branches. According to local tradition and observations from Western travelers in the 19th century, the prayer hall of the Monastery of Hilarion is currently occupied by the Mosque of al-Khidr. French explorer Victor Guérin noted that two marble columns in the mosque were possibly parts of the Byzantine-era monastery.

Early Islamic period
In 632, during the early period of Islamic rule in Arabia, the Muslim commander Usama ibn Zayd launched a raid against Byzantine-held Darum, which referred not to Deir al-Balah specifically, but to the area south of Lydda which included modern-day Deir al-Balah. The site was one of the first places in Palestine to be annexed by the Rashidun Caliphate following the conquest of Gaza by Amr ibn al-'As in 634. Throughout early Muslim Arab rule and until the arrival of the Crusaders in the late 11th century, "Darum" normally referred to the southern district of Jund Filastin whose capital fluctuated between the towns of Bayt Jibrin or Hebron.

The Fatimid caliph al-Aziz Billah (r. 975-996) granted his favored vizier, Yaqub ibn Killis, a fief in modern-day Deir al-Balah, as testified by an inscription dating to the 980s located in the city's al-Khidr Mosque. The fief included a large estate with date palms.

Crusader and Ayyubid rule
Deir al-Balah was built on the ruins of the Crusader fort of Darom (also referred to as "Doron") which was built by King Amalric I. The exact date of the fort's construction is unknown, although it was likely erected after 1153 following Amalric's capture of Ascalon to the north from the Fatimid Caliphate. As described by William of Tyre, the fort was small, tantum spatium intra se continens quantum est jactus lapidis (containing inside as much space as a stone's throw) and square-shaped with four towers, one of which was larger than the others. Amalric used Darom as a launching point for several unsuccessful military campaigns against Fatimid Egypt. In addition to its role as a frontier fort on the border of Egypt, Darom also served as an administrative center charged with collecting taxes from the southern areas of the kingdom and customs from caravans and travelers coming from Egypt. It was deemed a permanent threat by the rulers of Egypt.

Not long after its construction, a small suburb or village with a church was established by local farmers and traders just outside the fort. According to medieval chronicler William of Tyre, "it was a pleasant spot where conditions of life for people of the lower ranks were better than in cities". The population of the village consisted of indigenous Eastern Orthodox Christians allied to and protected by the Crusader administration and garrison based in the fort. The inhabitants were considered lower-class, but integral members of society by the Crusaders of European or mixed descent. Because Darom was absent of Greek bishops, in 1168 Pope Alexander III gave the Latin Patriarch of Jerusalem direct jurisdiction over the dioceses, putting the largely Greek Orthodox inhabitants under the authority of the Catholic Church.

Following Amalric's withdrawal from his fifth offensive against Egypt in 1170, Muslim general Saladin, fighting on behalf of the Fatimids, attacked and besieged the fortress as part of his foray into the Crusader Kingdom of Jerusalem. Despite initial gains, Darom was not captured or destroyed. It later became a stronghold of the Knights Templar and the Knights Hospitaller from Jerusalem, led by King Baldwin III. After the Muslim army defeated the Crusaders in the decisive Battle of Hattin in 1187, their leader Saladin, by then the independent sultan of the Ayyubid dynasty, advanced south and captured both Ascalon and Darom by 1188. His first order was the fort's demolition, but he later decided against destroying it. Instead, the fortress was substantially expanded and strengthened. "Darum", which is what the Muslims called the fortress village, was encased by a wall with 17 strong towers protected by a deep moat with stone-paved sides. It hosted a garrison commanded by the emir (commander) Alam ad-Din Qaysar and served as a store for supplies and ammunition.

The Crusaders recaptured the fortress on 24 May 1191 after a short siege commanded by King Richard the Lionheart. Authority over Darum was assigned to Count Henry I of Champagne, but Richard later had the fortress demolished in July 1193 prior to withdrawing his forces from Ascalon. The Ayyubids rebuilt the fortress soon after in order to use it as a bridgehead to reconquer territories lost in Palestine during the Third Crusade. Nonetheless, in 1196, Sultan al-Aziz Uthman decided to have it demolished in case of its capture by the Crusaders. According to 15th-century historian al-Maqrizi, this decision resulted in public resentment since travelers and merchants had significantly benefited from the fort's protection. In 1226, Syrian geographer Yaqut al-Hamawi visited Darum and noted it was one of the cities of Lot and contained a ruined castle.

Mamluk rule
Following its demolition, it is not known how long Darum remained deserted, but it was eventually resettled during Mamluk rule which began in 1250. For much of the Mamluk era, the town came under the administration of the politically important Niyabah of Gaza (Province of Gaza), part of the larger Mamlaka of Damascus (Kingdom of Damascus.) Along with Karatiyya and Bayt Jibrin, Darum was an amal (district) of the Province of Gaza with its own wali (governor).

It became a halting post along the newly introduced regular mail routes connecting Damascus and Cairo, which were run by horse-mounted messengers with colored sashes. Syrian historian Ibn Fadlallah al-Umari did not mention Darum in his list of the route's stopping points in 1349, instead noting that al-Salqah was the only post between Rafah and Gaza, suggesting that Darum was not a major settlement at the time. However, 14th-century Egyptian historian Ahmad al-Qalqashandi counters al-Umari's account, writing that Darum was the last halting post before Gaza. Roads, bridges, postal stations and a khan (caravanserai) were built in the town to accommodate the messengers. Pigeon mail service was introduced for which towers were built. Produce available in Darum during this time period included barley, wheat, grapes and grape leaves, olives, raspberries, lemons, figs, sweet melons, pomegranates and dates. Surrounding the town were the encampments of the Batn Jarm, an Arab clan that also lived around Gaza.

Ottoman era
Sometime prior to the Ottoman conquest of Palestine in 1516 or in the beginning years of Ottoman rule, Darum gained the additional name of "Deir" as in "Deir Darum" after its Byzantine-era monastery. The village continued to thrive during the early Ottoman era in Palestine which is attributed to the urban infrastructure originally established by the Crusaders. Its continued importance also stemmed from its close proximity to Gaza and its position on the former Via Maris trade route. The first Ottoman tax census in 1525 revealed Deir al-Balah was a relatively large village with a religiously mixed population of 87 Christian families and 56 Muslim families. In 1596 it was part of Gaza Sanjak (District of Gaza) and had a Muslim majority with 175 Muslim families and 125 Christian families. With an estimated population of 1,500, it was one of eight villages at the time to have between 1,000 and 2,000 inhabitants. Annual tax revenue from the town amounted to 17,300 akces.   Pierre Jacotin named  the village Deir K Helleh on his map from 1799. In 1838, Deir el-Belah was noted as a Muslim village in the Gaza district.

A substantial part of Deir al-Balah's inhabitants died in 1862 because of stagnant drinking water originating from the town's swamps. The swamps were seasonal, forming each winter as a result of flooding which failed to breach the sandstone ridge. A year later, on 29 May 1863, French explorer Victor Guérin wrote that Deir al-Balah was a small, partly ruined village with a population of 350. Date farming was the principal economic activity that the inhabitants engaged in. In 1878, the PEF's Survey of Western Palestine noted Deir al-Balah had grown to become a large village of mud houses "with wells and a small tower". At the time, it served as a see of the Greek Orthodox Church of Jerusalem.

Modern era

Deir al-Balah was captured by the British Army following the surrender of Khan Yunis on 28 February 1917. By April an aerodrome and an army camp were established there and Deir al-Balah became a launching point for British forces against Ottoman-held Gaza and Beersheba to the north and northeast, respectively. Of the 25 British war cemeteries dating from World War I, one of the six largest was built in Deir al-Balah in March 1917. It continued to be used until March 1918 and contains a total of 724 graves. Deir al-Balah became a part of the British Mandate of Palestine starting in 1922. A municipal council to administer the town was established by the British authorities in 1946, but it had limited jurisdiction over civil affairs and provided a few basic services.

In  the 1945 statistics, Deir al-Balah had a population of 2,560; 40 Christians and 2,520 Muslims, with 14,735 dunams of land, according to an official land and population survey. Of this, 327 dunams were for citrus and bananas, 472 plantations and irrigable land, 14,438 used for cereals, while 39 dunams were built-up land. In the lead-up to the 1948 Arab-Israeli War, residents of Deir al-Balah participated in a local attack against the nearby kibbutz of Kfar Darom, despite being discouraged by Egyptian Army officers, but they were repelled and suffered casualties. During the war, Egypt captured the town along with other towns in an area that became known as the Gaza Strip. The Egyptians later established a sharia court system that held jurisdiction over personal affairs. Egyptian rule introduced relative prosperity to Deir al-Balah. The town witnessed a booming citrus industry made possible by the discovery of a substantial reservoir of ground water in the vicinity.

During the Six-Day War in June 1967, Deir al-Balah's mayor Sulaiman al-Azayiza briefly led local resistance against the incoming Israeli Army until formally surrendering the city shortly thereafter. The Israeli authorities took control of the springs, an important irrigation source. This move combined with increasing competition from Israeli citrus farmers, damaged the local citrus industry. In 1982 the mayor was dismissed and the municipal council of Deir al-Balah was disbanded and replaced by an Israeli military-appointed administration. During the course of the Israeli occupation, Deir al-Balah's urban areas extended into lands designated for agriculture, largely as a result of building restrictions which hindered organized expansion.

When the First Intifada broke out in 1987, Deir al-Balah's residents participated in the uprising against Israeli rule. Around 30 residents were killed during the uprising, which formally ended in 1993 with the Oslo Accords between the Palestine Liberation Organization (PLO) and Israel. In 1994 Deir al-Balah was the first city to officially come under the control of the Palestinian National Authority as a result of the Gaza–Jericho Agreement.

The city has been frequently targeted in Israeli military incursions since the Second Intifada in 2000, in part due to Qassam rocket-strikes by Palestinian militants. The areas surrounding the city have also been frequent targets of razing. On 4 January 2004, Israeli authorities bulldozed around 50 dunams (5 hectares) of land in the Abu al-Ajen area east of Deir al-Balah's center. Later on 7 January, the Applied Research Institute-Jerusalem (ARIJ) reported that "Israeli bulldozers staged into al-Hikr area south of Deir el-Balah city under heavy barrage of gunfire and razed 70 dunams (7 hectares) of land planted with guava and orange groves owned by the Abu Holy and Abu Reziq families."

During factional clashes across the Gaza Strip in June 2007 which ended with Hamas gaining control over that territory, at least four paramilitaries from Hamas and Fatah were killed in Deir al-Balah. On 2 January 2009, Deir al-Balah was shelled by the Israeli Army as part of its month-long offensive Operation Cast Lead.

Geography
Deir al-Balah is situated in the central Gaza Strip, along the coastline of the eastern Mediterranean Sea. While the city's municipal borders stretch eastward toward the border with Israel, its urban area does not extend beyond the main Salah al-Din Highway to the east.

Nearby localities include Nuseirat Camp and Bureij Camp to the north, Maghazi Camp to the northeast and Wadi as-Salqa to the south.

The city has absorbed the coastal Deir al-Balah Refugee Camp, although it remains outside of Deir al-Balah's municipal administration. While the total land area was recorded as 14,735 dunams (14.7 km² or 1,473.5 hectares) in 1997, the total built-up areas of the city consist of between 7,000 and 8,000 dunams (7–8 km² or 700-800 hectares.) Deir al-Balah is divided into 29 administrative areas.

Archaeology
White marble pillar shafts were built into the walls of some houses in old Deir al-Balah. They resembled the medieval-era pillars in the Temple Mount ("Haram ash-Sharif") in Jerusalem.

Mosque of al-Khidr
The northern and southern walls were buttressed and the eastern wall has three apses. The Survey of Western Palestine related in 1875 that there were Greek inscriptions on one of the steps leading to the door at the southern wall while on the floor was a broken stone slab marked by two Maltese crosses, apparently resembling a tombstone. Further slabs and Greek inscriptions were found in the eastern part of the mosque and in the courtyard. In the center is a tomb made of modern masonry that tradition claims is the tomb of Saint George ("Mar Jirjis") or al-Khidr, as he is known in Arabic.

Prior to the predominance of orthodox Islam in Palestine, the region contained numerous domed structures dedicated to Muslim patron saints, among which was the Mosque of al-Khidr in Deir al-Balah. In March 2016, the Ministry of Tourism and Antiquities in the Gaza Strip began the restoration of the Mosque of al-Khidr with financial support from UNESCO and the Nawa Foundation. The project aims to convert the mosque-tomb into a children's cultural library.

Demographics

According to a census conducted in 1922 by the British Mandate authorities, Deir al-Balah had a population of 916 inhabitants, consisting of 893 Muslims, 22 Jews and 1 Christians.
With a population of 2,560 in 1945, Deir al-Balah was a relatively large village. The influx of Palestinian refugees from nearby areas captured by Israel during the 1948 War drastically increased the population thereafter. In the 1997 census by the Palestinian Central Bureau of Statistics (PCBS) Deir al-Balah's population was recorded as 42,839, a figure which included the adjacent Deir al-Balah Camp (the smallest refugee camp in the Gaza Strip.) Nearly 75% of the population were below the age of 30.

In 2004 the PCBS estimated the population to be 46,159. In the 2007 census by the PCBS, the population of Deir al-Balah city alone was 54,439, making it the largest municipality in the Deir al-Balah Governorate. The camp's population was 6,438. However, Nuseirat combined with its refugee camp has a larger population than Deir al-Balah combined with its camp. There were a total of 8,395 households and the average family size consisted of between six and seven members. The gender distribution in the city was 50.3% male and 49.7% female.

Deir al-Balah's entire population is Muslim. A sizable Greek Orthodox Christian population existed until the mid-19th century. In the 1931 British census of Palestine, there were only 10 Christians in Deir al-Balah out of a population of 1,587. Today, refugees make up the majority of the population, accounting for over 66% of the city's inhabitants in 1997. However, this figure also included the Deir al-Balah Camp.

Economy

The Deir al-Balah Governorate's principal economic activity is services, accounting for 67.4% of the labor force. Commerce, hospitality and retail account for 12.9%, agriculture and fishing 10.1%, transportation and communication 5.4% and manufacturing 3.4%. In 2009 the unemployment rate in the governorate was 35.2% while the labor force participation rate was 38.7%. In 2007 there were 1,108 business establishments in the city.

Agriculture and fishing
Deir al-Balah is well known for growing date palms, an estimated 20,000 of which covered the landscape south and west of the city in the 1990s. However, some 3,550 trees were uprooted or bulldozed by the Israeli Army in the early years of the Second Intifada beginning in 2000. There were an estimated 16,500 palms in Deir al-Balah in 2003. In addition to being a local delicacy, date cultivation constitutes one of the principal sources of income for many of Deir al-Balah's residents. The particular type of date that is cultivated in the area is known as "Hayani." It has a distinctly red color. Other leading agricultural products cultivated in Deir al-Balah include citrus, almonds, pomegranates and grapes.

The city has a small fishing industry and is the site of one of four wharfs in the Gaza Strip. In 2007 there were about 76 active fishing vessels employed by 550 fishermen. From 2000 to 2006, during the Second Intifada, income from fishing was halved. In order to alleviate losses resulting from a  fishing limit off the coast imposed by the Israeli Navy following Hamas's victory in the 2006 parliamentary elections, the Palestinian Authority Department of Fisheries has sought to construct eight artificial reefs in both Deir al-Balah and Gaza City.

Education
According to the 1997 PCBS census, 87.7% of residents in Deir al-Balah over the age of 10 were literate. The number of people who finished elementary education was 5,740, while 5,964 finished primary education and 5,289 completed secondary school. In higher education, 1,763 people attained associate degrees, 1,336 attained bachelor's degrees and 97 attained higher degrees.

Educational services in Deir al-Balah are under the jurisdiction of the Khan Yunis Directorate of Higher Education. There were a total of 85 schools in the Deir al-Balah Governorate in 2007-08 according to the PNA's Ministry of Education and Higher Education. The Palestinian government operated 39 school while four were privately owned. The remainder were run by UNRWA and were mostly located in refugee camps in Deir al-Balah's vicinity. The total number of students in the governorate was 67,693, of which 50.3% were male 49.7% female.

The Palestine Technical College, a vocational and technical college founded in 1992, is located in Deir al-Balah. A library was added to the campus in 1998.

Government
Deir al-Balah's first village council was established in 1946 and an elected local government continued to administer the city until 1982 when the Israeli military authorities dissolved the council and appointed a mayor. In 1994 Deir al-Balah gained the status of a city by the Palestinian Authority (PNA). The Palestinian president, Yasser Arafat, appointed Samir Mohammed Azayiza as mayor until 2000 when he replaced him with Sami Abu Salim, a wealthy businessman from the city. The services and functions of the municipality include city planning, infrastructure maintenance and repair, providing utilities, school administration and garbage collection.

A 15-member municipal council currently administers Deir al-Balah. Although thought to be a stronghold of Fatah, Hamas members defeated Fatah's candidates in the 2005 Palestinian municipal elections by a large margin, taking 13 seats. Despite their political affiliations, all candidates ran as Independents. Two female candidates also gained seats. Local sheikh, school operator and Hamas member Ahmad Harb Kurd garnered the most votes making him the current head of the municipality.

Mayors

 Sulaiman al-'Azayiza (at least 1967–1982)
 Israeli Military Governor (1982–1994)
 Samir Mohammed 'Azayiza (1994–2000)

 Sami Abu Salim (2000–2005)
 Ahmad Kurd (2005–)

See also
 Hanajira

References

Bibliography

 
 
 
 
 
 
  
 
 
 
 

 
 
 

 
 

 
  (p. 53)

External links
 Welcome To The City of Dayr al-Balah
Survey of Western Palestine, Map 19:  IAA, Wikimedia commons 
 Laborers in Deir al-Balah Governorate.
 Map of the Deir-al Balah Governorate 

 
Populated coastal places in Palestinian territories
Populated places of the Byzantine Empire
Cities in the Gaza Strip
Cities in ancient Egypt
Bronze Age sites in the State of Palestine
Philistines
Date palm orchards
Municipalities of the State of Palestine